Looking In is the sixth album by the British blues band Savoy Brown. The album featured "Lonesome" Dave Peverett on vocals after Chris Youlden left the band the previous spring. Leader/guitarist Kim Simmonds would be the only band member to continue with the band after this album, as all other band members left to form Foghat the following year.

It was released by Decca in 1970 (SKL 5066). For release in the United States and Canada, tapes were leased to Parrot Records (PAS 71042).

The album spent a week on the UK Official Charts and reached number 50. It did considerably better in the US where it spent 19 weeks on the Billboard 200, peaking at number 39, their second highest charting US album.

Track listing

Side one
 "Gypsy" (Kim Simmonds) – 0:57
 "Poor Girl" (Tony Stevens) – 4:04
 "Money Can't Save Your Soul" (Dave Peverett, Simmonds) – 5:34
 "Sunday Night" (Simmonds) – 5:23
 "Looking In" (Peverett, Simmonds) – 5:17

Side two
 "Take It Easy" (Peverett, Simmonds) – 5:47 (not 3:40 as printed on album)
 "Sitting an' Thinking" (Simmonds) – 2:40
 "Leavin' Again" (Peverett, Simmonds) – 8:29
 "Romanoff" (Simmonds) – 1:01

Personnel

Savoy Brown
 Kim Simmonds – lead guitar, piano
 Lonesome Dave – vocals, guitar
 Roger Earl – drums
 Tone Stevens – bass

Additional musicians
 Owen Finnegan – congas on some tracks

Technical
 Kim Simmonds – producer
 Savoy Brown – arrangements
 Paul Tregurtha – engineer
 Eric Holand – engineer
 Harry Fisher – mastering
 Anthony Hawkins – 1990 CD remastering
 David Anstey, Jim Baikie – artwork

Charts

Album

References

External links
Savoy Brown's Homepage

1970 albums
Savoy Brown albums
Decca Records albums
Albums produced by Kim Simmonds